Karim Camara (born June 3, 1971) is an American pastor and former Democratic member of the New York State Assembly, where he represented the 43rd Assembly District which includes parts of the Brooklyn neighborhoods of Crown Heights, Lefferts Gardens and East Flatbush. He is the founding and senior pastor of the Abundant Life Church in Brooklyn and was previously the executive pastor of First Baptist Church of Crown Heights. He was also the New York State Faith Director for the then-U.S. Senator Barack Obama's 2008 presidential campaign.

He was first elected to the State Assembly in a November 2005 special election to replace Clarence Norman Jr.  In February 2015, he vacated his seat to become executive director of the Office of Faith-Based Community Development.

Early life and education
A native of Brooklyn, Camara (born Karim Abdur-Razzaq) spent most of his childhood in Crown Heights, Brooklyn which is in the Assembly District he now represents. He also spent formative years both in Queens and on a farm in Westtown, New York (Orange County).

He graduated from Brooklyn Friends School in 1988. He went on to attain his B.A. in English Literature and Chemistry from Xavier University of Louisiana and a Masters of Divinity from the New York Theological Seminary.

Early career and personal life
He was the fundraising director for the Cush Campus Schools in Brooklyn, of which his mother is a founder and the principal.

Camara resides in Brooklyn with his wife, Orelia E. Merchant, an assistant U.S. Attorney and their two children.

Election results
 November 2005 special election, NYS Assembly, 43rd AD
{| class="Wikitable"
| Karim Camara (DEM) || ... || 8,411
|-
| Geoffrey A. Davis (IND) || ... || 1,818
|-
| Kenneth E. Cook (REP - CON) || ... || 1,093
|}

 November 2006 general election, NYS Assembly, 43rd AD
{| class="Wikitable"
| Karim Camara (DEM - WOR) || ... || 11,873
|-
| Kenneth E. Cook (REP - CON) || ... || 983
|}

 November 2008 general election, NYS Assembly, 43rd AD
{| class="Wikitable"
| Karim Camara (DEM - WOR) || ... || 26,769
|-
| Stuart Balberg (REP - CON) || ... || 2,096
|}

 November 2010 general election, NYS Assembly, 43rd AD
{| class="Wikitable"
| Karim Camara (DEM - WOR) || ... || 17,923
|-
| Menachem M. Raitport (REP - CON) || ... || 1,538
|}

References

External links 

KarimCamara.com
KarimCamara.org
PastorKarimCamara.org
Brooklyn Star on Camara's State of the District

1971 births
Living people
African-American state legislators in New York (state)
African-American Baptist ministers
Democratic Party members of the New York State Assembly
New York Theological Seminary alumni
People from Crown Heights, Brooklyn
Xavier University of Louisiana alumni
20th-century Baptist ministers from the United States
2012 United States presidential electors
21st-century American politicians
Baptists from New York (state)
Brooklyn Friends School alumni
20th-century African-American people
21st-century African-American politicians